Toggenburg is a region of Switzerland. It corresponds to the upper valley of the river Thur and that of its main tributary, the Necker. Since 1 January 2003, Toggenburg has been a constituency (Wahlkreis) of the canton of St. Gallen (SFOS number 1727).

Geography
The valley descends in a northwestern direction from the watershed between the Rhine and the Thur, and is enclosed on the northeast by the chain of the Säntis and on the southwest by that of the Churfirsten and of the Speer.

At Wildhaus, the highest village, the house wherein Huldrych Zwingli, the Swiss Reformer, was born in 1484, is still shown. Other villages are Lichtensteig, Kirchberg and Wattwil.

History
There are traces of the paleolithic Mousterian Industry throughout the Appenzell Alps, in the Toggenburg notably in Wildenmannlisloch cave.

The upper Thur valley was part of the province of Raetia in the Roman era, and was reached by Alemannic-speaking settlers only in the early medieval period. This is evidenced by a substantial substrate of Romance toponyms in the upper Toggenburg (upstream of Stein).

The name of the region is derived from that of the House of Toggenburg (named for their castle near Kirchberg) who ruled over parts of the Toggenburg region since the 12th century, in the 13th century taking the title of counts and extending their domain to include all of the upper Thur valley.
The extinction of the main line of the counts of Toggenburg  (1436) led to the Old Zürich War (1440–46) ultimately resulting in the temporary expulsion of Zürich from the Swiss confederacy. Eventually, the Toggenburg passed to the lord of Raron (in Valais), who sold it to the abbot of St. Gall in 1468.

Part of the Toggenburg followed the Swiss Reformation led by Zwingli, and the valley declared itself independent in 1530, but was forced to re-submit to the Abbot of St. Gall in 1538. The Abbot was, however, pressured into toleration of either confession, so that the Toggenburg became one of the few regions of Switzerland where Catholicism and Protestantism have a tradition of co-existence.

In 1707, the Toggenburg again declared its independence of St. Gall, in reaction to the Abbey's plans to build a road across the Ricken Pass, which was seen as a strategic arrangement towards a Catholic military alliance. The ensuing Toggenburg war of 1712 resulted in a balance of power between Catholic and Protestant cantons, ultimately leading to the formation of Switzerland as a federal state.

In the Helvetic Republic, the Toggenburg was divided between the cantons of Säntis and Linth. The parts were re-united as part of the canton of St. Gallen in 1803.

Schüblig, a type of sausage is a tradition in the area.

Demographics
Of the foreign population,, 584 are from Germany, 952 are from Italy, 3,124 are from ex-Yugoslavia, 167 are from Austria, 1,137 are from Turkey,  and 1,123 are from another country. Of the Swiss national languages, 41,718 speak German, 107 people speak French, 673 people speak Italian, and 47 people speak Romansh.

The age distribution, is; 6,296 children or 13.7% of the population are between 0 and 9 years old and 7,444 teenagers or 16.2% are between 10 and 19.  Of the adult population, 5,046 people or 11.0% of the population are between 20 and 29 years old.  6,784 people or 14.8% are between 30 and 39, 6,390 people or 13.9% are between 40 and 49, and 4,926 people or 10.7% are between 50 and 59.  The senior population distribution is 3,773 people or 8.2% of the population are between 60 and 69 years old, 3,269 people or 7.1% are between 70 and 79, there are 1,652 people or 3.6% who are between 80 and 89, and there are 326 people or 0.7% who are between 90 and 99, and 1 person who is 100 or more.

 there were 4,967 persons (or 10.8% of the population) who were living alone in a private dwelling.  There were 8,910 (or 19.4%) persons who were part of a couple (married or otherwise committed) without children, and 27,097 (or 59.0%) who were part of a couple with children.  There were 2,202 (or 4.8%) people who lived in single parent home, while there are 318 persons who were adult children living with one or both parents, 165 persons who lived in a household made up of relatives, 198 people who lived in a household made up of unrelated persons, and 2,050 who are either institutionalized or lived in another type of collective housing.

Out of the total population in the region, the highest education level completed by 11,393 people (24.8% of the population) was Primary, while 15,123 (32.9%) have completed Secondary, 3,627 (7.9%) have attended a Tertiary school, and 2,291 (5.0%) are not in school.  The remainder did not answer this question.

 the average unemployment rate was 2.9%.

Of the rest of the population, there are 29 individuals (or about 0.06% of the population) who belong to the Christian Catholic faith, there are 939 individuals (or about 2.05% of the population) who belong to the Orthodox Church, and there are 1,033 individuals (or about 2.25% of the population) who belong to another Christian church. There are 11 individuals (or about 0.02% of the population) who are Jewish, and 2,889 (or about 6.29% of the population) who are Islamic. There are 245 individuals (or about 0.53% of the population) who belong to another church (not listed on the census), 2,183 (or about 4.76% of the population) belong to no church, are agnostic or atheist, and 1,410 individuals (or about 3.07% of the population) did not answer the question.

Municipalities 
Since 1 January 2013, the Toggenburg district has consisted of ten municipalities:

Mergers and name changes
 On 1 January 2013 the former municipalities of Bütschwil and Ganterschwil merged to form Bütschwil-Ganterschwil, the former municipality of Krinau merged into the municipality of Wattwil and the former municipalities of Nesslau-Krummenau and Stein merged into the new municipality of Nesslau.
 On 1 January 2023 the former municipalities of Hemberg and Oberhelfenschwil merged to form the new municipality of Neckertal.

See also 

 Municipalities of the canton of St. Gallen

References

External links

Tourist information